Cavinder Bull  is a Singaporean lawyer and the chief executive officer of the law firm Drew & Napier. He has an active practice in complex litigation and international arbitration.

Career

Legal career 
Bull graduated with a Bachelor of Arts (first class honours) in Jurisprudence from Trinity College, Oxford University in 1992, and was called to the Bar of England and Wales the next year. He was ranked fourth in the Bar Exams; when he returned to Singapore, he topped the local Bar Exam. He served as a Justices' Law Clerk to former Chief Justice Yong Pung How before joining Drew & Napier in 1994, and left for Harvard Law School in 1995 on a Lee Kuan Yew Scholarship to pursue a Master of Laws. He then passed the New York Bar Exams and joined Sullivan & Cromwell as a litigation associate.

Bull re-joined Drew & Napier and was made a partner in 1998. He is involved in commercial litigation and is cited by Chambers Global and Asia Pacific Legal 500 as one of Singapore's top lawyers. In 2008, he was appointed Senior Counsel, the tenth lawyer to be made Senior Counsel before turning 40. Bull is also occasionally involved in academic writings, having written on subjects such as civil procedure. He has sat on various review committees, such as one chaired by the Attorney-General in 2006 regarding the supply of foreign lawyers in Singapore. In 2010, he was named Deputy Chairman of the Singapore International Arbitration Centre, and in 2011, he was appointed Vice President of the Asia Pacific Regional Arbitration Group.

Bull was named as the Co-Chairman of the Singapore Exchange disciplinary committee in April 2017, as well as the chief executive officer of Drew & Napier in August 2017.  Bull was also appointed to the Disciplinary Tribunal of the International Association of Athletics Federations.

Other Appointments

Directorships 
 Singapore Technologies Electronics (2009-2012)
 National Healthcare Group (2009-2012)
 Singapore University of Technology and Design (2009 - 2015)
 Ascendas Property Fund Trustee (2010-2013)
 Agri‑Food and Veterinary Authority of Singapore (2004-2010)

Personal life 
Bull and his two elder sisters were raised single-handedly by his mother after his father died when he was 15 months old. He studied at Anglo-Chinese School (Independent) and Anglo-Chinese Junior College.

References

Anglo-Chinese School alumni
Harvard Law School alumni
20th-century Singaporean lawyers
Singaporean Senior Counsel
Alumni of Trinity College, Oxford
Singaporean Christians
Living people
Sullivan & Cromwell associates
Year of birth missing (living people)
21st-century Singaporean lawyers